Ankyramorpha ("anchor forms") is an extinct clade of procolophonomorph parareptiles which lived between the early Cisuralian epoch (middle Sakmarian stage) to the latest Triassic period (latest Rhaetian stage) of Africa, Antarctica, Asia, Australia, Europe, North America and South America.

This clade was named in a 1996 parareptile study by Michael deBraga and Robert R. Reisz. They provided the name Ankyramorpha for a newly recognized clade encompassing "the most recent common ancestor of Procolophonia and Lanthanosuchoidea and all its descendants", and this clade name sees continued use among modern parareptile studies. A similar name, Hallucicrania, was provided in an earlier 1995 study by Michael S. Y. Lee, who defined it as the node-based taxon formed by the most recent common ancestor of lanthanosuchids and "pareiasauroids" (pareiasaurs + Sclerosaurus), and all its descendants. Unlike Ankyramorpha, which explicitly included procolophonoids, Hallucicrania was originally designed to exclude procolophonoids, which Lee's analysis argued to have split off prior to the divergence between lanthanosuchids and pareiasaurs. Nevertheless, purely considering the taxa encompassed by their definitions, Hallucicrania and Ankyramorpha refer to an identical grouping.

The following cladogram is simplified after the phylogenetic analysis of MacDougall and Reisz (2014) and shows the placement of Ankyramorpha within Parareptilia. Relationships within emboldened terminal clades are not shown.

References

Procolophonomorphs
Permian reptiles
Triassic reptiles
Permian reptiles of South America
Early Triassic reptiles of South America
Middle Triassic reptiles of South America
Late Triassic reptiles of South America
Cisuralian first appearances
Late Triassic extinctions